Volvo B54 was a front-engined midibus chassis manufactured by Volvo between 1966 and 1971. It was technically more or less just a Volvo F85 truck chassis without the cab. The engine was mounted on top of the front axle, giving the buses very little front overhang. Before the end of production in 1971, it was in a way replaced by the larger BB57, but the true successor was the F6-based B609 that came in 1976, half a decade later. The B54's predecessor had gone out of production in 1964, so it was clearly not a model that Volvo put a lot of effort into at the time. Only 533 chassis were built.

References

External links

Cab over vehicles
Vehicles introduced in 1966
B54
Midibuses
Bus chassis